Chatterbox Records was an independent record label based in Sydney, Australia, founded in 1997 by musician Nik Tropiano and Sebastian Chase of Phantom Records. The label boasts an eclectic mixture of various genres. Its first release was a vinyl EP from Sydney electro-goth band Cult 45. Just two years later, the label came close to mainstream success when Canberra nu metal band Henry's Anger was nominated for an ARIA Award in the 'Best Rock Album' category for the album Personality Test. In 2000 Chatterbox came close again when the Sydney all-girl rock act Skulker was nominated in the 'Best Independent Release' category for its album Too Fat for Tahiti.

By now, the label had built a considerable roster of local acts that also included punk legends The Hard Ons and the progressive metal band Alchemist. Chatterbox was also courting foreign acts, one of the first to sign to the label being latter-day glam rock act Toilet Böys. After this, Chatterbox has attracted a string of independent and alternative artists from all genres and in 2006 picked up Nashville Pussy as part of its growing list of international signings. The company also had arms that handle publicity, booking and management for artists not attached to the record label.

Current roster
 1,2 Seppuku
 Blacklevel Embassy
 Brian Jonestown Massacre
 Cockfight Shootout
 Einstellung
 Adam Franklin
 Further
 Ghosts of Television
 Grand Fatal
 Laura Imbruglia
 Massappeal
 Nashville Pussy
 Nunchukka Superfly
 Peabody
 Sing-Sing
 Stockholm Syndrome
 Talons
 Todd Sparrow
 Toilet Böys
 Wog

Former artists
 Alchemist
 Cult 45
 Daysend
 The Hard Ons
 Henry's Anger
 Psi.Kore
 Regular John
 Skulker
 Walk the Earth

Australian independent record labels
Record labels based in Sydney
Record labels established in 1997